”L.A. Story“ is a song by American rapper Sammy Adams. The song was released on May 28, 2013 through RCA Records. The song features American pop singer Mike Posner. The song was written by Sammy Adams, Mike Posner, Ryan Tedder, Noel Zancanella and Oren Yoel. Tedder and Zancanella also produced the song.

Music video
The official music video, which featured Mike Posner and model Miriam Adler, along with Adams skating through LA in reverse was released on May 14, 2013. The official video dropped July 16, 2013 and was directed by Jon Jon Augustavo.

Charts

References

2013 singles
2013 songs
RCA Records singles
Songs written by Mike Posner
Songs written by Ryan Tedder
Songs written by Noel Zancanella
Song recordings produced by Ryan Tedder
Song recordings produced by Noel Zancanella
Songs written by Oren Yoel